"Jack Your Body" is a house music song by Steve "Silk" Hurley, originally released as a single in 1986. It was featured on the album Hold on to Your Dream, released in 1987, under the alias J.M. Silk.

History
One of the landmark records in the history of house music, "Jack Your Body" was composed and produced by Hurley. The title refers to jacking, an ecstatic dance style that emerged within the Chicago house scene since the early to mid 1980s.

The song climbed to number twenty-five on the U.S. Billboard Hot Dance Music/Club Play chart, reaching number thirty-seven for the U.S. Maxi-Singles Sales category.

Despite its only moderate success in the U.S. chart, the song became a major hit on the UK Singles Chart, reaching number one for two weeks in January and February 1987. 
It was the UK's first house music number one, and paved the way for the acid house sound popular during the late 1980s.

"Jack Your Body" was also the first UK number one single to achieve the majority of its sales on the 12" format. Under the chart rules in place at the time, the 12" sales should not have counted toward the song's chart position, as its running time exceeded the then-current 25-minute limit. However, the 25-minute rule was not enforced, since the running time was not brought to the chart compilers' attention until the record was already at number one. Had the rule been enforced, the 7" of "Jack Your Body" would have peaked at Number 7 on the UK singles chart, while the 12" would have reached Number 1 on the album chart.

Hurley never promoted the track, as he was "under pressure" to complete the Hold on to Your Dream album. He didn't even know that the track had reached number one on the UK Singles Chart – when his manager mentioned, in passing, that the track had hit number one in the UK, he assumed this meant on the UK Dance Chart.

In spite of the song's success, Hurley has had no further solo singles whatsoever (under his own name) on the UK Singles Chart.

"Jack Your Body" was re-released, each time with new remixes, in 1987, 1992, 2000 and 2009.

Impact and legacy
In 1996, Oliver Bondzio of German electronic music duo Hardfloor chose "Jack Your Body" as one of the tunes that changed his life, saying, "This was one of the first tracks I heard being played in Checkers, a club in Düsseldorf I went to for three years. It had the best sound system and DJs. It was the first to play house and acid house tunes. I like the way they sampled the 'jack' in the old skool way. You can't forget this one."

In 2014, Rolling Stone featured it in their "20 Best Chicago House Records" list, adding, "Arriving a few years into house's existence, Hurley's "Jack Your Body" came out swinging with unapologetic experimentation — its Roland-centered electronic spine helping to touch off the acid house revolution in the U.K. Here was something far removed from disco's orchestral feel and entirely new. It was ultimately the first house song to hit Number One in the U.K."

In 2020, The Guardian ranked the song number 50 in their list of "The 100 greatest UK No 1s". They wrote, "It’s hard to imagine now how strange and alien Jack Your Body sounded in 1987. Other early house hits had at least come with a song or a hook attached, but this had neither: it may be the most minimal No 1 of all time. It isn’t by any stretch of the imagination the best Chicago had to offer in 1987: as a signal of a vast shift in the way pop music sounded, it’s unbeatable."

Track listings

1986 7" single
 "Jack Your Body (Edit)" – 3:13
 "Dub Your Body (Edit)" – 3:35

1986 12" single
 "Jack Your Body (Club Your Body)" – 6:50
 "Jack Your Body (Dub Your Body)" – 6:25
 "Jack Your Body (Home Made)" – 6:34
 "Steve 'Silk' Hurley" – 7:03

1987 12" single
 "Jack Your Body (Monty 'House' Remix)" – 6:29 (Remixed by Simon Harris)
 "Jack Your Body (Club Your Body)" – 6:50
 "Jack Your Body (Dub Your Body)" – 6:25

"Back To Jack Your Body '92" (12" and CD single)
 "Back To Jack Your Body (Remix)" – 4:52 (Remixed by Burger Industries)
 "Jack Your Body (Def-Mix)" – 6:47 (Remixed by Burger Industries)
 "Jack Your Body (Ambient-Remix)" – 9:38 (Remixed by The Bionaut)

"Jack Your Body 2000" (12" single number one)
 "Jack Your Body (Original 1986 Mix) (Digitally Re-Produced & Edited)" – 9:17
 "Jack Your Body (Silk's Y2K Mix)" – 6:56
 "Jack Your Body (Silk's Y2K Dub)" – 5:31

"Jack Your Body 2000" (12" single number two)
 "Jack Your Body (Jazz Yo Body Dub)"
 "Jack Your Body (Peppi & Kokki Remix)"
 "Jack Your Body (Kidd's Classic Remix)"
 "Jack Your Body (Swing Yo Body)"

"Jack Your Body" (2009 digital release)
 "Jack Your Body (Hardfloor Radio Edit)" – 3:15
 "Jack Your Body (Hardfloor Remix)" – 6:52
 "Jack Your Body (Ambient Remix By Burger Industries)" – 5:03
 "Jack Your Body (Original Club Mix)" – 6:53

Charts

See also
Lists of UK Singles Chart number ones

References

External links
 [ Steve "Silk" Hurley] on AllMusic
 [ J.M. Silk] on AllMusic

1986 songs
1986 singles
1987 singles
Steve "Silk" Hurley songs
UK Singles Chart number-one singles
Songs written by Steve "Silk" Hurley